Arch L. Madsen (December 4, 1913 – April 7, 1997) was the founder of Bonneville International and a president of KSL. He was a recipient of the Peabody Award, the Distinguished Service Award from the National Association of Broadcasters, and the "Giant in Our City" award from the Salt Lake Area Chamber of Commerce.

References

1997 deaths
1913 births